Haplochromis aeneocolor is a species of cichlid endemic to Uganda where it is found in Lake George and the Kazinga Channel.  This species can reach a length of  SL.

References

 Twongo, T.K. 2006. Haplochromis aeneocolor. In: IUCN 2012. IUCN Red List of Threatened Species. Version 2012.2. <www.iucnredlist.org>. Downloaded on 17 April 2013.

aeneocolor
Endemic freshwater fish of Uganda
Fish described in 1973
Taxonomy articles created by Polbot